The World Series of Poker Europe (WSOPE) is the first expansion effort of World Series of Poker-branded poker tournaments outside the United States. Since 1970, participants have had to travel to Las Vegas if they wanted to compete in the World Series of Poker (WSOP).  Although the WSOP held circuit events in other locations, the main tournaments, which awarded bracelets to the winners, were exclusively held in Las Vegas. The inaugural WSOPE, held in 2007, marked the first time that a WSOP bracelet was awarded outside Las Vegas.

In 2004, Harrah's Casinos purchased the rights to the WSOP label. Harrah's later purchased London Clubs International (LCI). LCI operates three casinos in the London area: Fifty, Leicester Square, and The Sportsman. After the purchase of these casinos, Harrah's decided to expand its WSOP label into Europe. European casinos typically have a different environment than those in the U.S. Jeffrey Pollack, the WSOP Commissioner, indicated that the WSOPE would have a "style and flair that is both unique and appropriate to the setting. So don't be surprised if we require participants to wear blazers at the tables. If James Bond were hosting a poker tournament it may look like the World Series of Poker Europe."

In marketing the WSOPE, Harrah's Casino did not rely upon the reputation of Harrah's or the WSOP alone. On July 5, 2007, Harrah's announced its alliance with England-based Betfair, one of the largest online gaming companies in the world. The agreement, the largest-ever union of an online and offline gaming company, is intended to build on Betfair's European reputation in advertising the WSOPE. Due to changes in U.S. laws, effective in 2007, the WSOP could no longer accept money from online gambling companies. This prevented the WSOP from acknowledging WSOP qualifiers from online events. The WSOPE is not bound by this limitation. The United Kingdom Gambling Act of 2005 allows for legal regulated online poker sites. Furthermore, as the laws that govern the age of gambling differ in England than the U.S., the WSOPE admits younger players. In 2007, one of these younger players, 18-year-old Annette "Annette_15" Obrestad became the youngest player to win a WSOP bracelet event.

The third WSOPE took place between September 17 and October 1, 2009. It consisted of four events held at the Casino at the Empire in Leicester Square, London. The first event saw J.P. Kelly emerge as the winner of a less-than-an-hour long heads up battle, overcoming a 3-to-1 chip deficit against Fabien Dunlop and earning his second World Series of Poker bracelet of the year. Kelly won most of his final chip stack in a flush-over-flush situation, leaving Dunlop with only 1% of chips in play. In the second event, Erik Cajelais easily defeated runner-up Mats Gavatin after entering the heads up phase with an almost 6-to-1 chip lead. The third event saw Finnish Full Tilt Poker pro Jani Vilmunen defeat Howard Lederer, the owner of Full Tilt brand, over the course of a 90-minute-long match with nearly even stacks. The Main Event featured a heated battle between Barry Shulman and Daniel Negreanu that lasted over five hours before Shulman eventually eliminated Negreanu by hitting a three-of-a-kind on the river. However, even in second place, Negreanu still topped the All Time Money List, the list of WSOP players ranked by total winnings.

Key

Results

Event 1: £1,000 No Limit Hold'em

4-Day Event: September 17, 2009 to September 21, 2009
Number of buy-ins: 608
Total Prize Pool: £608,000
Number of Payouts: 63
Winning Hand: 
Reference:

Event 2: £2,500 Pot Limit Hold'em/Omaha
3-Day Event: September 21, 2009 to September 23, 2009
Number of buy-ins: 158
Total Prize Pool: £395,000
Number of Payouts: 18
Winning Hand: 
Reference:

Event 3: £5,000 Pot Limit Omaha
3-Day Event: September 23, 2009 to September 25, 2009
Number of buy-ins: 154
Total Prize Pool: £770,000
Number of Payouts: 18
Winning Hand: 
Reference:

Event 4: £10,000 No Limit Hold'em

6-Day Event: September 26, 2009 to October 1, 2009
Number of buy-ins: 334
Total Prize Pool: £3,340,000
Number of Payouts: 36
Winning Hand: 
Reference:

References

World Series of Poker Europe